The Game Headwear is a headgear brand, specialising in caps and currently owned by MV Sport. TGH started in the 1960 as a sports equipment company, focusing on the minor leagues and school teams.

History
It originated as "Neil's Sporting Goods" in the 1960s. Initially started to equip little league and school athletic teams, the company's business greatly increased in the 1970s and 1980s until Neil had built a small chain of 9 sporting good stores.

Neil's Sport Shops grew into multiple divisions, which included a retail segment, team sales, concessions, and military. By 1984, the business had grown significantly. He sold his company to the W.C. Bradley Company in Columbus, GA, and stayed on as an officer. The separate divisions of Neil’s Sport Shops were eventually sold to other buyers. One of the buyers was Neil’s older brother, Bill, who bought the concession business and managed the concession sales for the majority of the Southeastern Conference schools. Neil saw the growth that was happening in the concession sales as well as the retail side of the sporting goods business. He had been overseas and seen the opportunity to import products for his stores and soon decided to import sporting goods apparel on his own to sell to the different colleges.

In 1986, Neil formed The Game and the W.C. Bradley Company agreed to stay involved as a financial partner. The primary focus of The Game was to provide headwear designs for Colleges across the country. This would include everything from the initial design of the caps to the sales force that would call on the individual schools. Neil’s younger brother Phil was an independent salesman for Nike at that time and also agreed to represent The Game. Soon afterwards, Phil helped develop a national sales force for The Game through his contacts with other salesmen throughout the country. Within a matter of months, The Game had its first product designs and a national sales force in place to sell it. All of this happened at a time when the demand for college apparel was about to skyrocket.

A natural progression for The Game was their move from a college only program into the professional sports programs such as Major League Baseball, National Football League, National Hockey League and the National Basketball Association.

When Neil originally started The Game in 1986 and brought in the W.C. Bradley Company as his partner, he had a 5-year agreement with them as President of the company. When it came time for him to renew his contract in 1992, he opted to not renew the contract. At this point, The Game was managed by the W.C. Bradley Company and was eventually sold to Russell Athletic in 1993.

As Neil began winding down his responsibilities at The Game, friend and founder of Realtree Outdoor Products, Bill Jordan introduced Neil to Tommy Allison who was the cousin and business manager for NASCAR driver Davey Allison. Davey and Tommy were looking for someone to help them with upgrading their licensed merchandise, which was primarily sold at NASCAR races. Over the next few months, Neil, Tommy, Davey and Bill talked and discussed the many opportunities available within NASCAR. By January 1993, Neil had decided retirement was not for him and formed A-Star promotions. The primary purpose of A-Star was to design, manage and sell all of the merchandise for the Davey Allison / Texaco Havoline racing team. This included everything from apparel to bumper stickers and miscellaneous souvenirs. The combination of Neil’s experience in importing merchandise, Davey’s success and fan following in NASCAR and the business management of Tommy Allison and Bill Jordan proved to be an instant success. When Davey’s merchandise began to show up at the races, other drivers and teams wanted to know where they could also get merchandise. The idea to form a separate company was born.

As business began booming for A-Star, Davey Allison was killed in a helicopter accident at Talladega Superspeedway. Although this ended what began as a strong start for A-Star, it was also the catalyst for forming Kudzu which became the company that began designing, importing and selling headwear and jackets to NASCAR teams just as The Game had done for college and professional sports. For the formation of Kudzu, Neil teamed with Tommy Allison, Neil’s brother Phil and Neil’s son Jeff.

From 1993 through 1998 several key events occurred. First, the W.C. Bradley Company sold The Game to Russell Athletic. This was a period marked by baseball strikes, reorganization of the NFL and many new headwear companies focusing on gaining market share in the college arena. Second, NASCAR experienced its greatest growth years with the addition of new racetracks, drivers becoming household names and most races being covered on national television networks. Kudzu’s business also grew exponentially as the company penetrated the majority of all of the leading NASCAR Winston Cup drivers and teams with their products. This also opened up the ability to work with major corporate sponsors on their apparel programs as well.

Neil still longed to be back in the college market with The Game and his original sales force. He would not have to wait long. In 1998, Neil was contacted by Russell Athletic wanting to know if he would be interested in purchasing The Game. By October 1998, a deal was completed and The Game was back with its original owners once again. Since then, Neil, Tommy, Phil, Jeff and the W.C. Bradley Company have been restoring the brand to the prominence it once enjoyed in the college markets.

In 2008, the Atlantic League of Professional Baseball signed a contract to outfit all eight of its teams with game and batting practice caps produced by The Game.

References

External links 
 

Clothing companies of the United States
Sportswear brands
Sporting goods manufacturers of the United States
Companies based in Columbus, Georgia